Notomulciber is a genus of longhorn beetles of the subfamily Lamiinae,.  containing the following species:

subgenus Micromulciber
 Notomulciber albosetosus Heller, 1923
 Notomulciber basimaculatus (Breuning & de Jong, 1941)
 Notomulciber biguttatus (Pascoe, 1867)
 Notomulciber bryanti (Breuning, 1939)
 Notomulciber decemmaculatus Breuning, 1942
 Notomulciber enganensis (Breuning, 1939)
 Notomulciber flavolineatus Breuning, 1947
 Notomulciber fuscomarginatus (Aurivillius, 1914)
 Notomulciber gressitti (Tippmann, 1955)
 Notomulciber javanicus (Breuning, 1956)
 Notomulciber notatus (Fisher, 1936)
 Notomulciber ochraceomaculatus (Breuning, 1939)
 Notomulciber ochreosignatus (Heller, 1921)
 Notomulciber palawanicus Breuning & de Jong, 1941
 Notomulciber quadrimaculatus Breuning & De Jong, 1941
 Notomulciber quadrisignatus (Schwarzer, 1925)
 Notomulciber sabahanus Vives & Heffern, 2016
 Notomulciber sexlineatus (Breuning, 1959)
 Notomulciber sexnotatus Breuning & de Jong, 1941
 Notomulciber strandi (Breuning, 1939)
 Notomulciber sumatrensis (Schwarzer, 1930)
 Notomulciber travancorensis (Breuning, 1958)
 Notomulciber trimaculatus (Breuning, 1939)
 Notomulciber variegatus (Aurivillius, 1914)
 Notomulciber viraktamathi Hiremath, 2018

subgenus Notomulciber
 Notomulciber carpentariae Blackburn, 1894
 Notomulciber celebensis Breuning, 1961

References

Homonoeini